This is a list of television stations in the country of Spain.

Free-access television

Nationwide stations

Autonomous communities-wide stations

Andalusia

Aragon

Asturias

Balearic Islands

Basque Country

Canary Islands

Cantabria

Castile and León

Castilla–La Mancha

Catalonia

Ceuta

Community of Madrid

Extremadura

Galicia

La Rioja

Melilla

Navarre

Region of Murcia

Valencian Community

Insular stations 
The insular stations are TV channels that are island-wide, which means they are visible in a specific island. These stations are exclusive to the Canary and Balearic Islands. This is a list of them (* means they haven't started their transmissions yet):

Local stations 
These TV stations are called local stations. They can only be seen in certain municipalities or comarcas, and their power is devolved to the autonomous communities. This is a list of them (* means they haven't started their transmissions yet):

Andalusia

Province of Almería

Province of Cádiz

Province of Córdoba

Province of Granada

Province of Huelva

Province of Jaén

Province of Málaga

Province of Seville

Aragon 

Canal 25 (Barbastro).

Province of Teruel

Province of Zaragoza

Asturias

Balearic Islands

Basque Country

Province of Álava

Province of Biscay

Province of Guipuzcoa

Canary Islands

Province of Las Palmas

Province of Santa Cruz de Tenerife

Cantabria

Castile and León

Province of Ávila

Province of Burgos

Province of León

Province of Palencia

Province of Salamanca

Province of Segovia

Province of Soria

Province of Valladolid

Province of Zamora

Castilla–La Mancha

Province of Albacete

Province of Ciudad Real

Province of Cuenca

Province of Guadalajara

Province of Toledo

Catalonia

Province of Barcelona

Province of Girona

Province of Lleida

Province of Tarragona

Ceuta

Community of Madrid

Extremadura

Province of Badajoz

Province of Cáceres

Galicia

Province of A Coruña

Province of Lugo

Province of Ourense

Province of Pontevedra

La Rioja

Melilla

Navarre

Region of Murcia

Valencian Community

Province of Alicante

Province of Castellón

Province of Valencia

References 

Spain
Television stations in Spain